Vladislav Petrovich Vinogradov (29 August 1899 in Kuznetsovo, Kazan Governorate – 13 April 1962) was a Soviet military leader. He fought in the First World War, Russian Civil War and Second World War and ended his military career Lieutenant General of the Quartermaster Corps.

During the occupation of Romania he represented Rodion Malinovsky, nominal head of the Red Army-dominated Allied Commission for Romania.

1899 births
1962 deaths
People from Mari El
People from Tsaryovokokshaysky Uyezd
Communist Party of the Soviet Union members
Soviet lieutenant generals
Imperial Russian Army officers
Russian military personnel of World War I
Soviet military personnel of the Russian Civil War
Soviet military personnel of World War II
Recipients of the Order of Lenin
Recipients of the Order of the Red Banner
Recipients of the Order of Suvorov, 2nd class
Recipients of the Order of Kutuzov, 2nd class
Recipients of the Order of Bogdan Khmelnitsky (Soviet Union), 1st class
Frunze Military Academy alumni